Edward Anderson (born April 18, 1998) is an American cyclist, who currently rides for UCI ProTeam .

References

External links

1998 births
Living people
American male cyclists
Sportspeople from Richmond, Virginia
Cyclists from Virginia